Heavy rock may refer to:

 Hard rock music
 Heavy metal music
 Acid rock music
 Stoner rock music

See also
 Heavy Rocks (disambiguation)
 Hard Rock (disambiguation)
 Heavy metal (disambiguation)
 "Heavy Music", a 1967 song by Bob Seger & The Last Heard